Monton & Weaste Cricket Club were a cricket club in the Central Lancashire League who played at Ellesmere Park in Eccles, Greater Manchester, England. They fielded a First and Second team after joining the league in 2005. They were originally recruited so that the league would return to sixteen member clubs, but Stand later announced their resignation for the 2005 season.

The club formed in 1998 when Monton merged with Weaste Cricket Club, after the latter's lease on their ground at Edward Avenue, Salford had been terminated and took up Monton's place in the Manchester and District Cricket Association. Monton had been a member of the Manchester Association since replacing Stockport in 1937. Stockport had left to join the CLL, but resigned in 1998. Monton & Weaste were chosen to replace them in 2004, ahead of five other applicants. In 2020 Monton, by then playing in the Greater Manchester Cricket League, reverted to their original name.

References

Central Lancashire League cricket clubs
Sport in the City of Salford
Cricket clubs established in 1998
1998 establishments in England
Cricket in Greater Manchester
Organisations based in Salford